The 1900 Nebraska gubernatorial election was held on November 6, 1900.

Incumbent Populist and Democratic fusion Governor William A. Poynter was defeated for re-election by Republican nominee Charles Henry Dietrich.

General election

Candidates
Major party candidates
William A. Poynter, People's Independent and Democratic fusion candidate, Incumbent Governor
Charles Henry Dietrich, Republican, banker

Other candidates
Lucius O. Jones, Prohibition
Taylor Flick, Midroad Populist, former member of the Kansas Legislature. Flick was nominated by a Midroad Populist convention which objected to fusion with the Democrats.
Prof. Theodore Kharas, Social Democrat

Results

Notes

References

1900
Nebraska
Gubernatorial